Shahrokhabad (also Romanized as Shāhrokhābād; also known as Shāhrokhābād-e Bozorg) is a village in Fahraj Rural District, in the Central District of Fahraj County, Kerman Province, Iran. At the 2006 census, its population was 27, in 7 families.

References 

Populated places in Fahraj County